Phrynobatrachus elberti is a species of frog in the family Phrynobatrachidae. The specific name elberti honours Johannes Elbert, a German naturalist who visited Kamerun in 1914. Common name Elbert's river frog has been coined for this species.

Taxonomy
Phrynobatrachus elberti was described as Hylarthroleptis elberti by German zoologist Ernst Ahl in 1925 based on seventeen syntypes. There are doubts about its taxonomic validity.

Description
Phrynobatrachus elberti resembles Phrynobatrachus graueri and Phrynobatrachus brongersmai, but has interorbital space that is about twice as wide as the upper eyelid.

Ecology
There are no observations of this species after its discovery, and its ecology is essentially unknown.

References

elberti
Frogs of Africa
Amphibians of the Central African Republic
Endemic fauna of the Central African Republic
Amphibians described in 1925
Taxa named by Ernst Ahl
Taxonomy articles created by Polbot